In molecular physics, the Hamaker constant (denoted ; named for H. C. Hamaker) is a physical constant that can be defined for a van der Waals (vdW) body–body interaction:

The magnitude of this constant reflects the strength of the vdW-force between two particles, or between a particle and a substrate.

The Hamaker constant  provides the means to determine the interaction parameter  from the vdW-pair potential, 

Hamaker's method and the associated Hamaker constant ignores the influence of an intervening medium between the two particles of interaction. In 1956 Lifshitz developed a description of the vdW energy but with consideration of the dielectric properties of this intervening medium (often a continuous phase).

The Van der Waals forces are effective only up to several hundred angstroms. When the interactions are too far apart, the dispersion potential decays faster than  this is called the retarded regime, and the result is a Casimir–Polder force.

See also
Hamaker theory
Intermolecular forces
van der Waals Forces

References

Physical chemistry
Intermolecular forces